| birth_place = Bethnal Green, England 
| height      = 
| position    = Defender
| youthyears1 =
| youthclubs1 = 
| years1      = 1974–1975 | clubs1 = Chelsea                         | caps1 = 0   | goals1 = 0
| years2      = 1975–1979 | clubs2 = Queens Park Rangers | caps2 = 30  | goals2 = 2
| years3      = 1979–1981 | clubs3 = Wimbledon                     | caps3 = 99  | goals3 = 12
| years4      = 1981–1987 | clubs4 = Orient                    | caps4 = 165 | goals4 = 17
| years5      = 1987–1988 | clubs5 = Fisher Athletic         | caps5 = 18  | goals5 = 0 
| totalcaps   = 
| totalgoals  = 
}}
Thomas Edward Cunningham (born 7 December 1955) is an English former professional footballer who made nearly 300 appearances in the Football League playing as a defender for Queens Park Rangers, Wimbledon and Orient.

References

1955 births
Living people
Footballers from Bethnal Green
English footballers
Association football defenders
Leyton Orient F.C. players
Chelsea F.C. players
Queens Park Rangers F.C. players
Wimbledon F.C. players
Fisher Athletic F.C. players
Barnet F.C. non-playing staff
English Football League players
National League (English football) players